Evalue-Ajomoro-Gwira is one of the constituencies represented in the Parliament of Ghana. It elects one Member of Parliament (MP) by the first past the post system of election. Kofi Arko Nokoe is the member of parliament for the constituency. He was elected on the ticket of the National Democratic Congress (NDC) and won a majority of 19,830 votes to become the MP. He succeeded Catherine Afeku who had become MP on the ticket of the New Patriotic Party (NPP).

See also
List of Ghana Parliament constituencies

References 

Parliamentary constituencies in the Western Region (Ghana)